The 2002 United States Senate election in South Carolina was held on November 5, 2002. Longtime Republican incumbent Strom Thurmond decided to retire at the age of 100, becoming the first centenarian to ever serve in Congress. At that time, Thurmond was the longest serving Senator in U.S. history, but his record was later surpassed by West Virginia's Robert Byrd.

Representative Lindsey Graham won the open seat, becoming the first non-incumbent Republican Senator from South Carolina since Reconstruction, as Thurmond had been elected as a Democrat, but switched parties in 1964. This was the first open Senate election in South Carolina since 1966.

Thurmond died at age 100 on June 26, 2003, a little under six months after leaving the Senate.

Democratic primary 
Alex Sanders, the former president of the College of Charleston, faced no opposition in the Democratic primary and thereby avoided a primary election.

Republican primary 
Representative Lindsey Graham had no challenge for the Republican nomination and thus avoided a primary election. This was due in large part because the South Carolina Republicans were preoccupied with the gubernatorial race, and also because potential rivals were deterred by the huge financial war chest Graham had amassed early in the campaign.

General election

Candidates 
 Ted Adams (C)
 Lindsey Graham (R), U.S. Representative
 Victor Kocher (L)
 Alex Sanders (D), former President of the College of Charleston

Campaign 

The election campaign between Graham and Sanders pitted ideology against personality.  Graham spread his message to the voters that he had a consistent conservative voting record and that his votes in Congress closely matched that of outgoing Senator Strom Thurmond.  Sanders claimed that he was best to represent South Carolina in the Senate because he held membership in both the NAACP, the Sons of Confederate Veterans, the NRA, and because he said that his positions more closely matched the citizens of the state.  He said that he was against the death penalty for religious reasons, supported abortion rights, and was for greater government involvement in education.  Graham attacked Sanders for these positions consistently throughout the campaign, but Sanders hit back at Graham for wanting to privatize social security.

Graham scored an impressive victory in the general election and the margin of victory proved that Democrats had little chance of winning an election in the state for a federal position.  He achieved his victory because he rolled up strong margins the Upstate and was able to also achieve a majority in the Lowcountry, an area which Sanders had been expected to do well since he hailed from Charleston.  However, strong support in the Lowcountry for Republican gubernatorial candidate Mark Sanford doomed Sanders chances of running up a margin in the coastal counties.

Debates
Complete video of debate, October 6, 2002
Complete video of debate, October 13, 2002
Complete video of debate, October 18, 2002
Complete video of debate, October 20, 2002
Complete video of debate, October 25, 2002

Predictions

Polling

Results

See also 
 2002 United States Senate elections
 List of United States senators from South Carolina
 2002 South Carolina gubernatorial election

References 
General

Specific
 
 
 
 
 

2002
South Carolina
2002 South Carolina elections